Karma is a 2015 Hong Kong horror television series produced by Hong Kong Television Network. The first episode premiered on 29 April 2015.

Cast
 Dominic Lam as Lam Kwok-leung
 Noel Leung as Chow Siu-kuen
 Leila Tong as Michelle Fong
 Lawrence Chou as Ken Wan
 Felix Lok as To Fung
 Kwok Fung as Suen Chun-yee
 Eddie Li as Jason Tse
 Emily Wong as Amanda Chin
 Alan Luk as Lee Kai-fat
 Chow Tsz-lung as the son of Lam Kwok-leung

Song list
 "藍蝴蝶" by Eva Chan (Episode 7 and 8)

References

External links
 Official website

Hong Kong Television Network original programming
2015 Hong Kong television series debuts
2010s Hong Kong television series